The Fort Harrison Hotel serves as the flagship building of the Flag Land Base, the Church of Scientology's spiritual headquarters in Clearwater, Florida, US. It is owned and operated by the Church of Scientology Flag Service Organization, Inc., a subsidiary of the Church of Scientology International.

The hotel has 11 stories and features 220 rooms, three restaurants, a swimming pool and a ballroom. The building is connected by a skywalk to the Flag Building.

History

The hotel opened in 1926 as the "New Fort Harrison Hotel", replacing the former Fort Harrison Hotel. It was built by developer Ed Haley and was used as a community center for many years. The hotel was operated by Ransom E. Olds, inventor of the Oldsmobile, from 1926 until his death in 1950.

The name comes from Fort Harrison, a Seminole War-era U.S. Army fort built in the 1830s, south of today's downtown Clearwater. The fort was named for William Henry Harrison and was the western counterpart of Fort Brooke in what became Tampa. (See also the history of Clearwater.)

In 1953, the hotel was bought by the Jack Tar Hotels and became known as the "New Fort Harrison Hotel, a Jack Tar Hotel". The company added a cabana area to the building.

By the 1970s, the hotel began to fall into disrepair. In 1975, the Church of Scientology, as part of its plan to take over Clearwater purchased the building under the names "Southern Land Development and Leasing Corp" and "United Churches of Florida Inc". In 1976, the Church of Scientology's connection and the named purchasers was reported by the St. Petersburg Times, as was the Church's plan for a $2.8 million restoration and upgrade of the hotel.

In 2007, the Church announced that the hotel would undergo another $20 million restoration project, but not when the project would begin.

Use in Scientology
The Fort Harrison Hotel is used, according to the Church of Scientology, as an area in which to feed, train and house visiting practitioners.

The hotel was used for the Rehabilitation Project Force (RPF), a program used to  
punish members of the Church of Scientology Sea Organization for "serious deviations." Members of the church in this institution are subject to prison-like conditions, forced labor and other human rights violations.

Notable incidents
In December 1926, daredevil Henry Roland scaled the building blindfolded.

The Fort Harrison Hotel has been the site of at least three suspicious deaths since 1975, most notably the death of Lisa McPherson, who died on December 5, 1995, after spending 17 days in room 174 of the building. The officially reported cause of death was a blood clot caused by dehydration and bedrest. The Church later challenged the findings of the autopsy in court. In 1997, a church spokesman acknowledged that McPherson died at the Fort Harrison, rather than on the way to the hospital. The church later retracted its spokesman's statement.

In February 1980, prior to McPherson's death, a Scientologist named Josephus A. Havenith was found dead at the Fort Harrison Hotel. He was discovered in a bathtub filled with water hot enough to have burned his skin off. The officially reported cause of death was drowning, although the coroner noted that, when he was found, Havenith's head was not submerged.

In August 1988, Scientologist Heribert Pfaff died of a seizure in the Fort Harrison Hotel. He had recently stopped taking his seizure medication in favor of a vitamin program.

In 1997, Clearwater police received over 160 emergency calls from the Fort Harrison Hotel, but they were denied entry into the hotel by Scientology security.

Trivia
In 1965, the Rolling Stones wrote their hit song "(I Can't Get No) Satisfaction" at the hotel.

The hotel was once the spring training home of the Philadelphia Phillies.

References

External links
 Video and photograph tour of the Fort Harrison Hotel
 Property record of 210 S Ft Harrison Ave, Pinellas County Property Appraiser

Skyscraper hotels in Florida
Hotel buildings completed in 1926
Scientology properties
Mediterranean Revival architecture in Florida
1926 establishments in Florida